The Covered Bridges of Bradford, Sullivan and Lycoming Counties are seven covered bridges in northcentral Pennsylvania in the United States, which were included on the National Register of Historic Places (NRHP) in a Thematic Resources submission on July 24, 1980. One of the bridges is in Bradford County, and three each are in Lycoming and Sullivan counties. The Sullivan County bridges are the oldest as all three were built in or circa 1850, while the 1898 Buttonwood Covered Bridge in Lycoming County is the youngest. On July 2, 1973, the Hillsgrove bridge was the first of the seven to be added to the NRHP, and it was the only one so listed before the Thematic Resources submission.

See also
List of bridges on the National Register of Historic Places in Pennsylvania

References

External links

 

Bridges
Bridges
Pennsylvania
Bridges in Bradford County, Pennsylvania